The Right Reverend William Hall Moreland (April 9, 1861 in Charleston, South Carolina – October 27, 1946) was Bishop of the Missionary District of Sacramento from 1899–1910, and Bishop of the Diocese of Sacramento from 1910 to 1933. This jurisdiction is now known as the Episcopal Diocese of Northern California.

See also 
List of bishops of the Episcopal Church in the United States of America

References

External links 
Genealogical notice

1861 births
1946 deaths
Episcopal bishops of Northern California